Sunrisers may refer to:

 Sunrisers (women's cricket), a cricket team in England
 Sunrisers Eastern Cape, a cricket team in South Africa
 Sunrisers Hyderabad, a cricket team in India
 Sunrisers Drum and Bugle Corps, a Drum and Bugle Corps in Long Island, New York
 Sylhet Sunrisers, a cricket team in Bangladesh (now renamed Sylhet Strikers)